Banded dwarf cichlid (Apistogramma bitaeniata) is a species of benthopelagic freshwater fish from South America.
It is a popular dwarf cichlid among fishkeepers.

It is found in blackwater rivers of the Amazon Basin in Brazil and Peru.

References

 Apistogramma bitaeniata – FishBase
 Banded dwarf cichlid, Apistogramma bitaeniata – Practical Fishkeeping

Apistogramma
Taxa named by Jacques Pellegrin
Fish described in 1936